Johannes Gerhardus Pienaar "Boom" Prinsloo (born 12 March 1989) is a former South African rugby union player who regularly played as a loose forward. He also played rugby sevens for South Africa from 2010 to 2012.

He retired from rugby in September 2018.

Career

International

Prinsloo represented the Blitzbokke between 2010 and 2012 and played in a total of 7 IRB Sevens World Series tournaments.

References

External links
 
 
 

Living people
1989 births
South African rugby union players
Rugby union flankers
Rugby union number eights
Sportspeople from Bloemfontein
Afrikaner people
Free State Cheetahs players
Cheetahs (rugby union) players
Alumni of Grey College, Bloemfontein
South Africa international rugby sevens players
Rugby sevens players at the 2010 Commonwealth Games
Commonwealth Games bronze medallists for South Africa
Commonwealth Games rugby sevens players of South Africa
Commonwealth Games medallists in rugby sevens
Medallists at the 2010 Commonwealth Games